Six Days in Fallujah is an upcoming tactical shooter game developed by Highwire Games and published by Victura. The game's plot follows a squad of U.S. Marines from 3rd Battalion, 1st Marines (3/1), fighting in the Second Battle of Fallujah over the span of six days in November 2004.

The premise of the game was the subject of controversy in 2009, with questions raised as to its appropriateness, especially given the fact that the true events the game is based upon were recent at the time. It was originally to be published by Konami, however, in April 2009, a spokesperson informed the Associated Press that Konami was no longer publishing the game due to the controversy surrounding it. The game was originally slated for a 2010 release, but it was cancelled due to controversy; the game was put on hold until 2016 after its original studio, Atomic Games, went bankrupt in 2011. 

In February 2021, the game was announced to be back in development at Highwire Games, consisting of former Halo and Destiny game developers. Six Days in Fallujah is expected to be released on Microsoft Windows, PlayStation 4, PlayStation 5, Xbox One, and Xbox Series X/S in 2023.

Background
In an interview with Atomic Games president, Peter Tamte, he stated that "One of the divisions in our company was developing training tools for the United States Marine Corps, and they assigned some U.S. Marines from 3rd Battalion, 1st Marines to help us out." However, a few months into development, 3rd Battalion, 1st Marines (3/1) was deployed in Iraq and participated in the Second Battle of Fallujah. The inspiration for the game came from a U.S. Marine who participated in the battle and asked to have a game made of it. Tamte later stated that "When they came back from Fallujah, they asked us to create a video game about their experiences there, and it seemed like the right thing to do." Tamte further stated that the goal of Six Days in Fallujah is to create the most realistic military shooter possible, and that "Ultimately, all of us are curious about what it would really be like to be in a war. I've been playing military shooters for ages, and at a certain point when I'm playing the game, I know it's fake. You can tell a bunch of guys sat in a room and designed it. That's always bothered me." Tamte further elaborated in an interview with Joystiq that, "The words I would use to describe the game—first of all, it's compelling. And another word I use—insight. There are things that you can do in video games that you cannot do in other forms of media. And a lot of that has to do with presenting players with the dilemmas that the Marines saw in Fallujah and then giving them the choice of how to handle that dilemma. And I think at that point, you know—when you watch a movie, you see the decisions that somebody else made. But when you make a decision yourself, then you get a much deeper level of understanding." Tamte describes the project as "a meticulously recreated in-game version of Fallujah, complete with real life Marines lending their names and likenesses, as well as recreations of specific events from the battle. It's almost like time travel. You're experiencing the events as they really happened."

Development
The team at Atomic Games interviewed over 70 individuals, composed of the returning U.S. Marines, Iraqi civilians, Iraqi insurgents, war historians, and senior military officials, and learned the psychological complexity of the battle. The game's director, Juan Benito, elaborated that "Through our interviews with all of the Marines, we discovered that there was an emotional, psychological arc to the Battle of Fallujah."

Atomic Games describes Six Days as a survival horror game, but not in the traditional sense. The fear in Six Days does not come from the undead or supernatural, but from the unpredictable, terrifying, and real tactics employed by the insurgents that were scattered throughout Fallujah. Benito states that "Many of the insurgents had no intention of leaving the city alive, so their entire mission might be to lie in wait, with a gun trained at a doorway, for days just waiting for a Marine to pop his head in. They went door-to-door clearing houses, and most of the time the houses would be empty. But every now and then, they would encounter a stunningly lethal situation... which, of course, rattled the Marines psychologically." GamePro has stated that for Benito, giving players a taste of the horror, fear, and misery experienced by real-life Marines in the battle was a top priority. Benito states "These are scary places, with scary things happening inside of them. In the game, you're plunging into the unknown, navigating through darkened interiors, and 'surprises' left by the insurgency. In most modern military shooters, the tendency is to turn the volume up to 11 and keep it there. Our game turns it up to 12 at times but we dial it back down, too, so we can establish a cadence."

According to one of the developers who worked on the game, the development team consulted non-fiction books about the battle as part of their research, such as Patrick K. O'Donnell's We Were One: Shoulder to Shoulder with the Marines Who Took Fallujah, incorporating their recollections into the game's events and story-line.

Atomic Games has also stated that the game's environments are 100% destructible and degradable thanks to a completely custom rendering engine, and it would surpass that of Battlefield: Bad Company. Tamte states that "This engine gives us more destructive capability than we've seen in any game, even games that aren't finished yet." According to the developers, destructible environments are critically important in telling the true story of the events in Fallujah, as the Marines eventually learned to blow holes in houses using C4, grenade launchers, air strikes and depleted uranium shells to blindside anyone waiting within, being considered as "combat puzzles". It is also stated that the claim of the game containing destructive environments is genuine and not based around a "goofy, out-of-place marketing gimmick".

On April 27, 2009, it was announced that, due to the controversial nature of the game, Konami suspended its role as a publisher. The game is still in development by Atomic games, but Konami will not be publishing it. On August 6, 2009, Atomic Games said that they were unable to obtain a new publisher and would let go of some staff. A day later Industrygamers stated that they heard from a source, "Out of 75 people, less than a dozen are left and about a third of that isn't even developers.  The remaining team is basically a skeleton cleanup crew that will be gone soon too.  They are trying to downplay the extent of these layoffs, but the reality is that Atomic is pretty much dead."

On March 2, 2010, IGN claimed the game is still coming out and is finished. In August 2012, it was revealed that Sony may have once considered publishing the title. Later that month, Atomic Games' president, Peter Tamte, informed the British website, Digital Spy, that Six Days in Fallujah was "definitely not canceled" and remains "very important" to the studio. In 2018, Tamte again stated that the game was not cancelled, that the assets were still intact, and that it would eventually be finished and released at an undetermined future date.

Sony Interactive Entertainment's Santa Monica Studio had developed the game at one point.

In February 2021, it was announced that Victura, a company formed by Peter Tamte in 2016, would release the game later the same year, and that Highwire had been contracted as developers. This revived version would feature extensive commentary from Marines and civilians, as well as two playable campaigns: one in which the player controls a squad of Marines to hunt down insurgents while avoiding civilian casualties and another where the player controls a patriarch of an Iraqi civilian family as they struggle to escape the war zone. After a dearth of reports over its developmental status throughout the year, the developers announced that the game will be delayed to 2022, as they need more time, resources and manpower to deliver its intended experience. As of October 2022 the game has been pushed back to 2023.

Controversy
Shortly after the announcement of the game, Six Days was met with criticism by war veterans from the United Kingdom, as well as from a British pressure group, Stop the War Coalition.

To counter the accusations made by critics, in an interview with Joystiq, Tamte stated that "As we've watched the dialog that's taken place about the game, there is definitely one point that we want people to understand about the game. And that is, it's not about the politics of whether the U.S. should have been there or not. It is really about the stories of the Marines who were in Fallujah and the question, the debate about the politics, that is something for the politicians to worry about. We're focused now on what actually happened on the ground."

In another instance he said: "Are we effectively sanitizing events by not doing that? I don't think that we need to portray the atrocities in order for people to understand the human cost. We can do that without the atrocities."

The decision to revive and eventually release the game in 2021 drew widespread criticism, with a number of people calling for it to be ultimately cancelled, or denied licensing from Sony, Microsoft and Valve.  A local civilian survivor of the Iraq War, Najla Bassim Abdulelah, argued that while the developers really had good intentions for making a game like Fallujah, the very act of adapting a real-life battle into a video game would trivialize it as a form of entertainment, if not a pure one.

References

External links

Six Days in Fallujah at IGN

Cancelled PlayStation 3 games
Cancelled Xbox 360 games
First-person shooters
Iraq War video games
Multiplayer and single-player video games
Obscenity controversies in video games
PlayStation 4 games
PlayStation 4 Pro enhanced games
PlayStation 5 games
Survival video games
Tactical shooter video games
Upcoming video games scheduled for 2023
Video games about the United States Marine Corps
Video games developed in the United States
Video games set in 2004
War video games
Windows games
Xbox Cloud Gaming games
Xbox One games
Xbox One X enhanced games 
Xbox Series X and Series S games